The buzzing frog (Cophixalus bombiens) is a species of frog in the family Microhylidae.
It is endemic to Australia.
Its natural habitats are subtropical or tropical moist lowland forests and subtropical or tropical moist montane forests.
It is threatened by habitat loss.

References

Cophixalus
Amphibians of Queensland
Taxonomy articles created by Polbot
Amphibians described in 1985
Frogs of Australia